The Haas VF-21 is a Formula One racing car designed and constructed by Haas to compete during the 2021 Formula One World Championship. The car was driven by Nikita Mazepin and Mick Schumacher, both of whom competed in their first season, with additional testing work carried out by Pietro Fittipaldi and Kevin Magnussen.

Design and development
The Haas VF-21 was powered by the 2021 Ferrari power unit, the 065/6. Ferrari developed an in-season engine upgrade which was introduced to the works team at the Turkish Grand Prix. Haas declined to take the upgrade.

The VF-21 chassis used in the 2021 season are modified VF-20 chassis, rather than new vehicles. The chassis, as it was raced at the Bahrain Grand Prix, was identical to the VF-20 except for the downforce cuts mandated by the 2021 regulations.

Haas introduced an upgrade package for the chassis at the Emilia Romagna Grand Prix, which would be the one and only change to the chassis in 2021. The upgrade package was not significant enough to require spending development tokens (introduced for development from 2020 to 2021 as a cost-saving measure), meaning Haas was the only constructor not to make any significant changes to its 2020 vehicle. Haas constructed a new chassis for Mazepin which was put into use at the Belgian Grand Prix.

Livery
When the car's livery was revealed, it was a cause for controversy as it appeared to feature the Russian flag (due to the team having a Russian title sponsor and driver, Uralkali and Nikita Mazepin respectively). Guenther Steiner, the Haas team principal, stated that "it's the athlete who can't display the Russian flag, not the team. The team is an American team."

Complete Formula One results
(key)

Notes
 † Driver failed to finish the race, but was classified as they had completed over 90% of the winner's race distance.

References

External links 
 Official website

2021 Formula One season cars
VF-21